René Duhamel (1 February 1935 – 12 March 2007) was a French male rower. He has competed at the 1960 Summer Olympics and in the 1964 Summer Olympics. 

Duhamel has also competed at the inaugural World Rowing Championships held in 1962. He along with Bernard Monnereau won the gold medal in the men's double scull (M2×) event representing France.

References

External links 
Profile at World Rowing

1935 births
2007 deaths
French male rowers
Rowers at the 1960 Summer Olympics
Rowers at the 1964 Summer Olympics
Olympic rowers of France
World Rowing Championships medalists for France
European Rowing Championships medalists